"Wie soll ich dich empfangen" ("Ah! Lord, how shall I meet Thee", literally: How shall I receive you) is a Christian hymn for Advent by Paul Gerhardt. It was first published in 1653 in the fifth edition of the hymnal Praxis Pietatis Melica by Johann Crüger, who also created a melody. Johann Sebastian Bach used it as a chorale in his Christmas Oratorio, but with a different melody. Catherine Winkworth translated five of its ten stanzas.

History 
Paul Gerhardt wrote the lyrics in the first person, beginning with the theme, the question how to receive Jesus who is expected to arrive. The poet alludes to biblical narrations, such as his entry into Jerusalem and the parable of the ten virgins. The lyricist was also inspired by prophetic words from the Old Testament.

The hymn appeared first in the fifth edition of the hymnal Praxis Pietatis Melica by Johann Crüger in 1653.

Text 
The song is structured in ten stanzas of eight lines each, in bar form. The singer, speaking in the first person, addresses Jesus, establishing a relationship. The first question is "How shall I receive you?". The first five stanzas, using the verbs "empfangen" (receive) and "umfangen" (surround") expand God's love for humans. The image of a "Fackel" (torch) in the first stanza relates to the parable of the ten virgins,() the image of palm branches offered for the reception is reminiscent of the entry into Jerusalem.

The later five stanzas describe the condition of the congregation as stressful and threatened by enemies, pointing out especially fear of a day of wrath which is expected in a near future (stanza 6: "steht vor der Tür" (stands at the door, as in ). The term Advent (arrival) appears in four meanings in the following stanzas: in mercy, as redeemer, as king, and as judge.

Catherine Winkworth translated five of its ten stanzas freely, beginning "Ah! Lord, how shall I meet Thee".

Melodies and settings 
Johann Crüger first published the hymn in 1653 in the fifth edition of the hymnal Praxis Pietatis Melica by Johann Crüger, with a melody he composed himself.

Dietrich Buxtehude arranged the hymn as a cantata, BuxWV 109. The first stanza from the hymn also appears in Johann Sebastian Bach's Christmas Oratorio, but set to Hans Leo Hassler's "Befiehl du deine Wege" melody (Zahn 5385a)—the same melody as "O Haupt voll Blut und Wunden", which returns in the work's final movement.

In the current Protestant hymnal Evangelisches Gesangbuch, the song is EG 11. It is also part of several other hymnals and songbooks.

Literature 
Paul Gerhardt: Dichtungen und Schriften. Munich 1957, pp. 1–3.
Johann Friedrich Bachmann: Paulus Gerhardts geistliche Lieder: historisch-kritische Ausgabe. Oehmigke, Berlin 1866, pp. 95–97.

References

External links 
 Wie soll ich dich empfangen im Liederprojekt von SWR2 und Carus-Verlag
 Kalenderblatt "Wie soll ich dich empfangen?" Ein Adventslied aus dem Jahr 1647. SWR2, 9 December 2012
 Bach Cantata Translations / BWV 248-I – "Jauchzet, frohlocket, auf, preiset die Tage" Emmanuel Music

Advent songs
Lutheran hymns
Hymn tunes
1653 works
17th-century hymns in German
Hymns by Paul Gerhardt